Chung Mong-gyu, born in Seoul in 1961, is one of South Korea's top business leaders and the chairman of HDC Group. He has been serving as the 53rd President of Korea Football Association (KFA), a title held for 2 consecutive terms since 2013. In May 2017, he won a seat on FIFA Council. Chairman Chung received his bachelor's degree in business administration at Korea University in 1985, and completed his master's degree in politics, philosophy and economics at the University of Oxford in 1988.

Education
1988.02: Master's degree in Politics, Philosophy and Economics (PPE), Oxford University
1985.02: Bachelor's degree in Business Administration, Korea University
1980.02: Graduated Yongsan High School

Chronology
May 2018 ~ Present: Chairman, HDC Holdings Co., Ltd.
April 2018 ~ present: President, East Asia Football Federation
May 2017 – present: Member, FIFA Council (2017–present)
January 2017 – present: Vice President, Korean Sport & Olympic Committee
September 2016 – present: Vice President, Asian Football Confederation (AFC)
September 2016 – present: Chairperson, AFC Referees’ Committee
July 2016 – present: 53rd President, Korea Football Association (KFA)
March–August 2016: Chef de Mission, 2016 Summer Olympics South Korea Team
March 2016 – present: Chairman, 2017 FIFA U-20 World Cup Organizing Committee
August 2015 – present: Member, AFC Development Committee
August 2015 – present: Deputy Chairman, 2019 AFC Asian Cup Organizing Committee 
May 2015 – May 2017: Member, AFC Executive Committee
March 2014 – present: Vice President, East Asian Football Federation (EAFF)
August 2013 – December 2016: Member, Organizing Committee for the FIFA Club World Cup
February 2013 – March 2014: President, EAFF
January 2013 – June 2016: 52nd President, KFA
April 2011 – March 2013: Member, AFC Ad-Hoc Committee
January 2011 – January 2013: 9th President, K League (Korea Professional Football League)
March 2000 – present: Keynote Speaker, 33rd Pacific Basin Economic Council (PBEC) International General Meeting
2000–present: Chairman, Busan IPark FC (2000–present)
February 1999 – May 2018: Chairman, HDC Hyundai Development Company
1998–1999: Chairman, Federation of Korean Industries (FKI) Korea-Britain Business Leaders Forum
1997–1999: 5th President, Korean Automobile Manufacturers Association
1997–1999: Chairman, Jeonbuk Hyundai Motors FC
1996–1999: Chairman, Hyundai Motor Company
1994–1996: Chairman, Ulsan Hyundai FC
1988.11: Joined Hyundai Motor Company

Career
Chung Mong-gyu served as Chairman and CEO of Hyundai Motor Company from January 1996 to March 1999. He has managed Hyundai Development Company since his appointment as chairmanship in March 1999. 
 
Hyundai Development Company, a parent entity of Hyundai Development Company Group, is a comprehensive construction company established in 1976 and has created more than 400,000 apartment units in Korea including Samsung-dong IPARK, Suwon IPARK CITY and Haeundae IPARK. In addition, Hyundai Development Company has been active in various areas such as city development, residential/commercial buildings, civil engineering and social infrastructure.

Hyundai Development Company has diversified its business areas to include manufacture, distribution, IT, leisure and service, with real estate & infrastructure construction as the center. The affiliates of Hyundai Development Company include Hyundai EP, I·Controls, I·Service, Hyundai IPARK Mall, Young Chang Music, I&CONS, Hotel IPARK, Hyundai PCE, IPARK Sports, HDC Asset Management and HDC Shilla Duty Free.

Through his engagement in IPARK Volunteer Corps, which was launched in 2004 as a social contribution committee of Hyundai Development Company, Chairman Chung has been actively promoting corporate social responsibility. In particular, with the establishment of Pony Chung Foundation, which is a nonprofit scholarship organization, he has been carrying out various programs such as Pony Chung Innovation Award, Academic Grants and Domestic/Overseas Scholarships.

Through his ownerships of Ulsan Hyundai FC (1994-1996), Jeonbuk Hyundai Motors FC (1997-1999) and Busan IPARK FC (2000–present), Chairman Chung has continuously supported the development of Korean Football industry.

Elected as the 9th President of the K League (Korean Professional Football League ) in 2011, he handled the match-fixing scandals with determination and acumen. In 2013, he was elected as the 52nd President of the Korea Football Association (KFA), a title being served for 2 consecutive terms since his reappointment as the 53rd President in 2016. In addition, he served as Vice President of East Asian Football Federation (EAFF) (2013-2014), Member of the Organizing Committee for the FIFA Club World Cup (2013-2016), Chef de Mission of 2016 Summer Olympics South Korea Team (2016) and Member of Asian Football Confederation (AFC) Executive Committee (2015-2017).

His current roles include Deputy Chairman of 2019 AFC Asian Cup Organizing Committee (2015–present), Member of AFC Development Committee (2015–present), Chairman of 2017 FIFA U-20 World Cup Organizing Committee (2016–present), Chairperson of AFC Referees’ Committee (2016–present), Vice President of AFC (2016–present), Vice President of Korean Sport & Olympic Committee (2017–present) and Member of FIFA Council (2017–present). Since his joining the FIFA Council, Chairman Chung has been devoting his efforts to co-hosting the 2030 FIFA World Cup with China, Japan and North Korea.

Awards
1997 Winner of the 2nd Korea-China Young Researcher's Award (economics segment)
1997 “100 Global Leaders of Tomorrow” by the World Economic Forum

Family

References 

1961 births
Living people
20th-century South Korean businesspeople
South Korean billionaires
Hyundai people
Businesspeople from Seoul
Korea University alumni
Alumni of the University of Oxford
21st-century South Korean businesspeople
South Korean football executives
South Korean football chairmen and investors